Minsk Cycling Club is a Belarusian UCI Continental team founded in 2014, that competes on the road and track.

After the 2022 Russian invasion of Ukraine, the UCI said that Belarusian teams are forbidden from competing in international events.

Team roster

Major wins
2015

Grand Prix of Moscow, Siarhei Papok
Stage 1 Five Rings of Moscow, Siarhei Papok
Grand Prix Minsk, Siarhei Papok
Stage 6 Tour of China I, Siarhei Papok
2016
Stages 2b & 3 Tour of Ukraine, Siarhei Papok
Grand Prix of Vinnytsia, Siarhei Papok
Stage 4 Tour de Serbie, Kanstantsin Klimiankou
Overall Course de Solidarność et des Champions Olympiques, Yauhen Sobal
Stage 5, Yauhen Sobal
Grand Prix Minsk, Siarhei Papok
Prologue Tour of Taihu Lake, Oleksandr Golovash
2017
Stage 3 La Tropicale Amissa Bongo, Stanislau Bazhkou
Stage 6 La Tropicale Amissa Bongo, Oleksandr Golovash
Overall Tour of Mersin, Stanislau Bazhkou
Stage 1, Stanislau Bazhkou
Stage 2, Siarhei Papok
 National Time Trial Championships, Stanislau Bazhkou
Grand Prix Minsk, Yauheni Karaliok
Stage 3 Tour of Qinghai Lake, Stanislau Bazhkou
2018
Stage 3 Tour of Cartier, Nikolai Shumov
Overall Tour of Mersin, Eduard Vorganov
Stage 2, Branislau Samoilau
Stage 3, Eduard Vorganov
Stage 4, Yauheni Karaliok
Stage 2 Five Rings of Moscow, Stanislau Bazhkou
Stage 3 Five Rings of Moscow, Vasili Strokau
Stage 1 Tour of Estonia, Yauheni Karaliok
Horizon Park Race Maidan, Branislau Samoilau
Horizon Park Race Classic, Branislau Samoilau
Stage 3 Tour de Serbie, Branislau Samoilau
 National Road Race Championships, Branislau Samoilau
Grand Prix Minsk, Nikolai Shumov
2019
Grand Prix Gazipasa, Branislau Samoilau
Grand Prix Velo Alanya, Nikolai Shumov
Stage 1 Tour of Mersin, Branislau Samoilau
Overall Tour of Mesopotamia, Branislau Samoilau
Stage 1, Branislau Samoilau
Overall Five Rings of Moscow, Yauhen Sobal
Stage 1 Nikolai Shumov
Horizon Park Race for Peace, Yauhen Sobal
 National Time Trial Championships, Yauhen Sobal
Stage 9 Tour of Qinghai Lake, Siarhei Papok
Stage 2 Tour of Xingtai, Vasili Strokau
Grand Prix Erciyes, Nikolai Shumov
Stage 1 Tour of Kayseri, Stanislau Bazhkou
2020
GP Manavgat, Branislau Samoilau
 National Road Race Championships, Yauhen Sobal
 National Time Trial Championships, Yauheni Karaliok
2021
Stage 2 Tour of Mevlana, Siarhei Shauchenka
 National Time Trial Championships, Yauheni Karaliok
 National Road Race Championships, Stanislau Bazhkou
2022
Grand Prix Justiniano Hotels, Yauheni Karaliok

National champions
2017
 Belarus Time Trial, Stanislau Bazhkou
 Belarus U23 Time Trial, Yauheni Karaliok

2018
 Belarus Time Trial, Branislau Samoilau

2019
 Belarus Time Trial, Yauhen Sobal

2020
 Belarus Road Race, Yauhen Sobal
 Belarus Time Trial, Yauheni Karaliok 

2021 
 Belarus Time Trial, Yauheni Karaliok
 Belarus Road Race, Stanislau Bazhkou

References

External links

UCI Continental Teams (Europe)
Cycling teams based in Belarus
Cycling teams established in 2014
2014 establishments in Belarus